Brian DeLunas (May 3, 1975 – January 17, 2022) was an American baseball coach. He served as the bullpen coach of the Seattle Mariners of Major League Baseball (MLB) in 2018 and 2020, and as the pitching coach of the Missouri Tigers from 2021 until his death.

Career
DeLunas attended Oakville High School in Oakville, Missouri, and Missouri Baptist University, where he played college baseball for the Missouri Baptist Spartans. He served as the pitching coach for the Missouri Tigers of the University of Missouri from 2006 through 2009. He coached the pitchers on the baseball team at Christian Brothers College High School from 2010 through 2011. He then cofounded and worked as program director of Premier Pitching and Performance and served as director of pitching development for CSE Baseball.

The Seattle Mariners hired DeLunas as their bullpen coach prior to the 2018 season. He served as the Mariners Director of Pitching Development Strategies during the 2019 season. He was returned to the role of bullpen coach for the 2020 season. The Mariners did not renew his contract after the 2020 season. In June 2021, DeLunas became the pitching coach for the Missouri Tigers.

Personal life
DeLunas and his wife, Johannah, had two children.

DeLunas died from kidney disease on January 16, 2022, at the age of 46.

References

External links

1975 births
2022 deaths
Sportspeople from St. Louis County, Missouri
Baseball coaches from Missouri
Baseball players from Missouri
Baseball pitchers
Missouri Baptist Spartans baseball players
Missouri Tigers baseball coaches
Seattle Mariners coaches
Major League Baseball bullpen coaches
Deaths from kidney disease